Heterochorista papuana is a species of moth of the family Tortricidae. It is found in Papua, Indonesia, on the island of New Guinea.

References

Moths described in 1952
Archipini